This is the progression of world record improvements of the triple jump W40 division of Masters athletics.

Key

References

Masters Athletics Triple Jump list

Masters athletics world record progressions
Triple jump